Franz Mühlenberg (May 19, 1894 – February 16, 1976) was a German politician of the Christian Democratic Union (CDU) and former member of the German Bundestag.

Life 
He was a member of the German Bundestag from its first election in 1949 to 1961. He represented the constituency of Aachen-Land in parliament.

Literature

References

1894 births
1976 deaths
Members of the Bundestag for North Rhine-Westphalia
Members of the Bundestag 1957–1961
Members of the Bundestag 1953–1957
Members of the Bundestag 1949–1953
Members of the Bundestag for the Christian Democratic Union of Germany